”Quand nos bourgeons se rouvriront” ("When the spring comes round") is a song for solo soprano, part of a staged recitation with orchestra Une voix dans le désert written by the English composer Edward Elgar in 1915.  The words are by the Belgian poet Émile Cammaerts'.

It was first performed in a performance of Une voix dans le désert at the Shaftesbury Theatre, London, on 29 January 1916, sung by the soprano Olga Lynn, with the recitation by the Belgian dramatic performer Carlo Liten, and the orchestra conducted by the composer.

The French title "Quand nos bourgeons se rouvriront" literally translates into "When our buds shall re-open", but in the English version of the lyrics, by Cammaerts' wife Tita Brand, it became "When the spring comes round".

The song was published separately by Elkin & Co. in 1916, inscribed "English version by R. H. Elkin".  The words are the same as in the vocal score of Une voix dans le désert, so it is not clear whether the English translation of the song is by Tita Brand or by Elkin.The Pall Mall Gazette described the scene on the wartime front in West Flanders, Belgium:
  
 
Lyrics

References

Kennedy, Michael, Portrait of Elgar (Oxford University Press, 1968) 
Moore, Jerrold N. “Edward Elgar: a creative life” (Oxford University Press, 1984) 

External links

Recordings

 The CD with the book Oh, My Horses! Elgar and the Great War has many historical recordings including Une voix dans le désert with Quand nos bourgeons se rouvriront'', a 1985 recording with Alvar Lidell (narrator), Valerie Hill (soprano) and the Kensington Symphony Orchestra conducted by Leslie Head

Notes

Songs by Edward Elgar
1915 songs